Hudson Bay may refer to:

In geography
 Hudson Bay, a large body of water in northeastern Canada, also known as Hudson's Bay
 Hudson Bay drainage basin, the drainage basin of Hudson Bay
 Hudson Bay, Saskatchewan, a town in Saskatchewan, Canada
 Rural Municipality of Hudson Bay No. 394, the surrounding rural municipality
 Hudson Bay Regional Park, a park in Saskatchewan
 Hudson Bay (electoral district), a territorial electoral district for the Legislative Assembly of Nunavut, Canada
 Hudson Bay (N.W.T. electoral district), a former territorial electoral district in the Northwest Territories Legislature
 Hudson Bay, one of the five colonies of New France, apparently becoming Rupert's Land in 1763

In transportation
 Winnipeg – Churchill train, formerly known as the Hudson Bay

Other
Hudson's Bay (department store) A Canadian retail store

See also
Hudson's Bay (disambiguation)